
Lights are the lungs of game or livestock as used in cooking and butchery. Although technically offal, lights are rarely used in English-speaking culinary traditions, with the exception of the Scottish national dish haggis.

In Malaysia, slices of beef lights (paru, literally "lung" in Malay) are coated in flour and turmeric powder, deep-fried, and sold in packets at street markets. These are a very popular snack eaten with chilli sauce and a dash of vinegar.

Bopis is a piquant Philippine dish of pork or beef lungs and heart sautéed in tomatoes, chilies and onions.

See also

Mutton
Veal
Venison

Notes and references

Notes
Pig’s Liver (Includes lights) Mrs Beeton’s Book of Household Management. 1861.
The River Cottage Meat Book. Hugh Fearnley-Whittingstall. 2007.

References

Fotobank Veal Lungs 
Offal of the week:Lungs

Offal